Troponin T (shortened TnT or TropT) is a part of the troponin complex, which are proteins integral to the contraction of skeletal and heart muscles. They are expressed in skeletal and cardiac myocytes. Troponin T binds to tropomyosin and helps position it on actin, and together with the rest of the troponin complex, modulates contraction of striated muscle.  The cardiac subtype of troponin T is especially useful in the laboratory diagnosis of heart attack because it is released into the blood-stream when damage to heart muscle occurs. It was discovered by the German physician Hugo A. Katus at the University of Heidelberg, who also developed the troponin T assay.

Subtypes
 Slow skeletal troponin T1, TNNT1 (19q13.4)
 Cardiac troponin T2, TNNT2 (1q32)
 Fast skeletal troponin T3, TNNT3 (11p15.5)

Reference values
The 99th percentile cutoff for cardiac troponin T (cTnT) is 0.01 ng/mL. The reference range for the high sensitivity troponin T is a normal < 14 ng/L, borderline of 14-52 ng/L, and elevated of >52 ng/L.

Background
The troponin complex is responsible for coupling the sarcomere contraction cycle to variations in intracellular calcium concentration. Increased troponin T levels after an episode of chest pain indicates myocardial infarction. It was discovered by the German physician Hugo A. Katus at the University of Heidelberg. He also developed the troponin T assay. In patients with stable coronary artery disease, the troponin T concentration has long been found to be significantly associated with the incidence of cardiovascular death and heart failure, but it was 2014 before it began to be accepted as a predictor of who would later suffer acute myocardial infarction (heart attack).

Significance in Covid-19 mRNA vaccinations 
A study carried out by the University of Basel and the University Hospital of Basel found that a Covid-19 mRNA vaccination significantly elevates the cardiac troponin T levels in the blood stream. 3 % of the study subjects have shown elevated amounts of the protein after their 3rd vaccination. The effect was most pronounced among young men. It is not yet clear what the mechanism is, and the observed troponin levels were still much lower than in clinically significant heart disease. Given that previous studies only registered 35 cases of heart muscle inflammation per million subjects, the involved researchers were surprised by the results.

See also
 Troponin C
 Troponin I
 Calcium-binding protein
 Sliding filament model

References

External links
 

Troponin